Valte is a surname. Notable people with the surname include:

Abigail Valte (born 1980), Philippine political spokesman
Vunzjagin Valte, Indian politician